The Poullin JP.30 was a French single-seat agricultural aircraft designed and built by Jean Poullin, of which one example was constructed and first flown on 15 August 1952.

Development
The JP.30 was specified for agricultural use including crop-spraying. It was a single-seat high-wing monoplane with a fixed tailwheel undercarriage.

Operational history
After several years agricultural service, the aircraft, F-WGIR, was retired and used as an advertising feature for the former Bar de l'Escadrille at Guyancourt airfield to the west of Paris, where it was last noted in June 1963.

Specifications (variant)

References

1950s French civil utility aircraft
High-wing aircraft
Single-engined tractor aircraft
Aircraft first flown in 1952
Agricultural aircraft